Farraday is an unincorporated community and coal town in Letcher County, Kentucky, United States.  The now-defunct post office was located on Thornton  Creek, a tributary of the North Fork of the Kentucky River.

References

Unincorporated communities in Letcher County, Kentucky
Unincorporated communities in Kentucky
Coal towns in Kentucky